John Murphy (1948 – 21 May 2020) was an Irish Gaelic footballer, manager, coach and selector. His career included All-Ireland Championship victories as a player and later as a coach and selector with the Down senior football team.

Playing career

From the Newry Shamrocks club, Murphy won a MacRory Cup medal with Abbey CBS in 1964, before featuring for the Down minor team at midfield in their All-Ireland final loss to Mayo in 1966. Two years later, as a forward on the Down senior team, Murphy scored a goal in the team's 1968 All-Ireland final victory over Kerry. The team had claimed the 1967-68 National League title earlier in the season. As a player, Murphy also won two Railway Cup medals with Ulster and two Ulster Championship titles.

Coaching career

Alongside Pete McGrath, Murphy was part of the management team that saw Down win All-Ireland Championships in 1991 and 1994. Later he helped guide Mayobridge to three consecutive county senior championships from 2004 to 2006.

Death

Murphy died on 21 May 2020.

Honours

Player

Abbey CBS
MacRory Cup (1): 1964

Down
All-Ireland Senior Football Championship (1): 1968
Ulster Senior Football Championship (1): 1968, 1971
National Football League (1): 1967-68
Ulster Minor Football Championship (1): 1966

Ulster
Railway Cup (2): 1970, 1971

Coach

Mayobridge
Down Senior Football Championship (3): 2004, 2005, 2006

Down
All-Ireland Senior Football Championship (2): 1991, 1994
Ulster Senior Football Championship (1): 1991, 1994

References

1948 births
2020 deaths
Down inter-county Gaelic footballers
Ulster inter-provincial Gaelic footballers
Gaelic football selectors
Gaelic football managers